Erwin Lake is a lake in Douglas County, in the U.S. state of Minnesota.

Erwin Lake was named for George Erwin, a pioneer farmer who settled there.

See also
List of lakes in Minnesota

References

Lakes of Minnesota
Lakes of Douglas County, Minnesota